Central Coast may refer to:

Australia
 Central Coast (New South Wales), an official region of New South Wales, Australia
 Central Coast Council (New South Wales), a local government area in New South Wales
 Central Coast Mariners, the professional football A-league club based in the region
 Central Coast United FC, an amateur football club based in the region
 Central Coast Stadium, Gosford
 Central Coast Storm, a rugby league club based in the region
 Central Coast Waves, a rugby union team playing in the Shute Shield
 Central Coast Council (Tasmania), a local government area in Tasmania

Canada
 Central Coast Regional District, in British Columbia, Canada

United States
 Central Coast (California), in California, United States
 Central Coast AVA, a large American viticultural area